Victor Alfred Lundy (born February 1, 1923) is an American architect. An exemplar of modernist architecture, he was one of the leaders of the Sarasota School of Architecture. His Warm Mineral Springs Motel, outside Warm Mineral Springs, Florida, is listed in the National Register of Historic Places. He was honored by the Smithsonian on his 90th birthday in 2013. A film on his life and work, entitled "Victor Lundy: Sculptor of Space" was premiered by the GSA on February 25, 2014.

Missing from the list of works: St. Paul’s Lutheran Church Sanctuary from 1968, next to the Fellowship Hall. It is if poured in place concrete building with a steel cable and wood deck roof.

Work

 Drive-In Church, Venice, FL (1954). Demolished.
 Greater Sarasota Chamber of Commerce (Pagoda Building), Sarasota, FL (1956) 
 South Gate Community Center, Sarasota, FL (1956)
 Alta Vista Elementary School, a.k.a. The "Butterfly Wing," Sarasota, FL (1957)
 Joe Barth Insurance Office [today, Murray Homes], Sarasota, FL (1957)
 Herron House, Venice, FL (1957)
 Bee Ridge Presbyterian Church, Sarasota, FL (1957)
 Waldman Building, 533 S. US 301 (1958)
 Warm Mineral Springs Motel, North Port, FL (1958)
 St. Paul's Lutheran Church Fellowship Hall, Sarasota, FL (1958)
 Galloway Furniture Showroom, Sarasota, FL [today, Visionworks] (1959)
 "Bubble Pavilions" for the New York World's Fair of 1964–65 (The Brass Rail Snack Bars)
 Church of the Resurrection Harlem, New York City (1966) Demolished.
 First Unitarian Church, Westport, CT (1960)
 United States Embassy, Colombo, Sri Lanka (1961-1985)
 Sierra Blanca (New Mexico) Ski Apache Ski Resort Lodge (1961)
 Hillspoint Elementary School, Westport CT (1962)
Unitarian Meeting House, Hartford, CT (1964)
 IBM Garden State Office, Cranford, NJ (1965)
 Lundy Residence in Aspen, Colorado (1972)
 U.S. Tax Court Building, Washington, D.C. (completed 1974)
 Austin Centre, Austin, Texas (1986)
 One Congress Plaza, Austin, Texas (1987)

See also
National Register of Historic Places listings in Sarasota County, Florida

References

Further reading
 Kacmar, Donna. Victor Lundy: Artist Architect. Princeton Architectural Press, 2018. 
Victor Lundy Dwell magazine August 2008
 Drawings by Victor Lundy in Normandy France as a young soldier in WW2
 Solaguren-Beascoa de Corral, Félix: Motel Warm Mineral Springs, 2011, Barcelona, Grupo PAB Departamento de Projectos Arquitectónicos, 22-33 pages. 

1923 births
Living people
20th-century American architects
Modernist architects
Architects from New York City
American centenarians
Men centenarians